Michalis Kalamiotis (born 23 April 1990) is a Greek football defender currently playing for the Greek Super League club AEK Athens.

He made his debut for AEK in October 2010 in the Greek Cup against Panthrakikos.

References

External links
Profile on AEK Athens official website

1990 births
Living people
Footballers from Athens
Greek footballers
AEK Athens F.C. players
Association football defenders